Rickard is both an English surname and a masculine Swedish given name. It is of European origin and it is closely related to the given name Richard and the surnames Rickards and Richards.

People with the surname
Bob Rickard (born 1945), founder and editor of the UK magazine Fortean Times: The Journal of Strange Phenomena
Brenton Rickard, (born 1983), breaststroke swimmer from Australia
Bruce Rickard, (1929–2010), Australian architect and landscape architect
Cliff Rickard, (born 1943),  Australian Paralympic athlete, snooker player and table tennis player
Clinton Rickard, (1882–1971),  Tuscarora chief known for founding the Indian Defense League, and for promoting Native American sovereignty
Derek Rickard, (born 1947), English footballer
Diana Rickard, (born 1953), Australian competition swimmer
Doug Rickard, (1939–2002), Australian-born space engineer
Edgar Rickard, (1874–1951), mining engineer and lifelong confidant of U.S. President Herbert Hoover
Eva Rickard, (1925–1997), activist for Māori land rights and for women's rights
Frank Rickard, (1884–1975), Canadian MP
Georgia Rickard, Australian-born journalist, magazine editor, author and media commentator.
Jack Rickard, (1922–1983), illustrator best known for his contributions to Mad magazine
Jeff Rickard, sports broadcaster
Jessie Louisa Rickard, (1876–1963), also known as Mrs Victor Rickard, Irish literary novelist
John Rickard, (born 1945), economist from Australia
John Rickard (civil servant), (1940–2013), former Chief Economic Advisor to the British Government
John T. Rickard, (1913–2000), former Mayor of Santa Barbara, California
Laurence Rickard, (born 1975), English writer and comedian, one half of the comedy duo "Larry and George"
Louise Rickard, (born 1970), Welsh rugby union player
Matt Rickard, (born 1993), English football striker
Pamela Rickard, (1928–2002), Australian biochemist
Ricky Rickard, (born 1958), New Zealand professional wrestler
Reuben Rickard, (1841–1896), mining engineer and President of the Town Board of Trustees in Berkeley, California from 1891 to 1893
Sam Rickard, (born 1971), vision impaired Paralympic athletics competitor from Australia
Stanley Rickard, (1883–1976), New Britain-born Australian architect
Steve Rickard, (1929–2015), New Zealand professional wrestler, trainer, and promoter
Tex Rickard, (1870–1929), American boxing promoter, founder of the New York Rangers of the National Hockey League (NHL), and builder of the third incarnation of Madison Square Garden in New York City
Thomas Rickard, (1865–1911), British born mining engineer and last President of the Town Board of Trustees in Berkeley, California from 1903 to 1909
Thomas Arthur Rickard, (1864–1935), British born mining engineer and publisher and writer on mining engineering subjects
William Thomas Rickard, (1828–1905), English recipient of the Victoria Cross

People with the given name
Rickard Christophers, (1873–1978), Brevet Colonel Sir (Samuel) Rickard Christophers was a British protozoologist and medical entomologist
Rickard Deasy, (1812–1883) Irish lawyer and judge
Rickard Deasy (Farming Campaigner), (1916–1999), farmers' rights campaigner in Ireland
Rickard de Bermingham, (died 1322), aka Rickard Mac Fheorais, was Anglo-Irish lord of Athenry
Rickard Engfors, (born 1976) Swedish model, stylist and former drag queen
Rickard Ericsson, (born 1974), Swedish entrepreneur
Rickard D. Gwydir, (1844–1925), Confederate soldier, Indian agent, and early Washington pioneer
Rickard Hallström, (born 1973), Swedish curler
Rickard Koch, (born 1976), Swedish bandy player
Rickard William Lloyd, (1859–1933), Consulting Anaesthetist and author
Rickard Näslin, (born 1947), Swedish musician
Rickard Nordstrand, (born 1976), Swedish Light Heavyweight kickboxer
Rickard Olsson, (born 1967), Swedish television and radio presenter
Rickard Persson (born 1959), Swedish politician
Rickard Rakell, (born 1993), Swedish professional ice hockey centre
Rickard Rydell, (born 1967), Swedish racing driver
Rickard Sandler, (1884–1964), Swedish Social Democratic politician
Rickard Sarby, (1912–1977), Erik Rickard Sarby was a Swedish sailor
Rickard Sjöberg, (born 1969), Per Rickard Arvid Sjöberg is a Swedish journalist, television presenter and game show host
Rickard Söderberg, (born 1975), Swedish tenor, singer and debater
Rickard Söderberg, (born 1975), Swedish tenor, singer and debater
Rickard Strömbäck, Swedish footballer who played as a defender
Rickard Wallin, (born 1980), Carl Rickard Wallin is a Swedish professional ice hockey centre

See also
Reckard

English-language surnames